These are the results for the 2005 edition of the Tour de Pologne cycling race. Despite getting four cyclists in the decisive break,  didn't manage to take the overall win from Kim Kirchen.

Stages

12-09-2005: Gdańsk-Elbląg, 149.6 km.

13-09-2005: Tczew-Olsztyn, 226.5 km.

14-09-2005: Ostróda-Bydgoszcz, 212 km.

15-09-2005: Inowrocław-Leszno, 213 km.

16-09-2005: Wrocław-Szklarska Poręba, 212 km.

17-09-2005: Piechowice-Karpacz, 153 km.

18-09-2005: Jelenia Góra-Karpacz, 61 km.

18-09-2005: Jelenia Góra-Karpacz, 19 km. (ITT)

General Standings

KOM Classification

Points Classification

Sprints Classification
The sprints classification jersey is awarded to the rider with the most points awarded in the intermediate sprints.

Best Team

External links

Race website

Tour de Pologne
2005
Tour de Pologne
September 2005 sports events in Europe